Norfolk Southern Bridge may refer to:

Norfolk Southern Bridge (Kenova, West Virginia), crossing the Ohio River between South Point, Ohio and Kenova, West Virginia
Norfolk Southern–Gregson Street Overpass, in Durham, North Carolina
Norfolk Southern James River Bridge, in Richmond, Virginia
Norfolk Southern Lake Pontchartrain Bridge, in Louisiana
Norfolk Southern Six Mile Bridge No. 58, crossing the James River near Lynchburg, Virginia
Norfolk Southern Tennessee River Bridge, at Decatur, Alabama